Kristýna Plíšková was the defending champion, but chose not to participate.

Kateryna Kozlova won the title after defeating Vera Zvonareva 6–4, 6–2 in the final.

Seeds

Draw

Finals

Top half

Bottom half

Qualifying

Seeds

Qualifiers

Lucky losers

Qualifying draw

First qualifier

Second qualifier

Third qualifier

Fourth qualifier

References
Main Draw
Qualifying Draw

Dalian Women's Tennis Open - Singles
2017